Los Ronisch are a Bolivian cumbia band. They originate from Cochabamba and are one of the most popular cumbia bands in South America.  The press have called this band "the box-office record breakers" due to its vast popularity among people in Bolivia, Peru, Argentina, Ecuador and other countries.

History 
The band is composed of six brothers:
First voice: Walter Rodriguez 
Keyboards: Renán Rodriguez
First Guitar: Remberto Rodriguez
Bass: Héctor Rodriguez (Director)
Drums: Norberto Rodriguez
Sampler and Rhythms: Fernando Rodriguez 
The live concerts include an animator, German Zambrana being one of them during the late 90s.

Los Ronisch, named after the family's old German Rönisch piano, started playing in the late 80's, focusing more in a type of Rock that is similar to new wave, with influences from disco, electronic music, and pop.  One of their first hits, Isabel, remains a classic of pop music in Bolivia.  This type of music regarded as "Disco" in Bolivia was also practiced by another popular Bolivian band called Maroyu.  
Towards the end of the 90's the band remained highly popular; however, it shifted the focus of its music towards Cumbia (Los Ronisch played Cumbia and Huayño regularly since their start in the late 80's).  This shift to a more electronic sound, relying more heavily on the keyboards and the sampler as a backbone, made some people in Peru relate the band's style to Tecnocumbia.  This shift can be heard in the "Regresa" album of 1999.  The popularity of the band exponentially increased with the release of "Regresa" and the singles "Amigos Traigan Cerveza" and "Prefiero Estar Lejos", making the band play numerous cities throughout South America, USA and Europe (Spain).

Discography (incomplete) 
Los Ronisch - Isabel - soledad -Un Sueño Hecho Realidad - 1989 (vol1)
Los Ronisch - Princesa - 1990 (vol2)
Los Ronisch - Digas lo que digas - 1991 (vol 3)
Los Ronisch - La plaza - 1992
Los Ronisch - dime dime 
Los Ronisch - te quiero (vol 6)
Los Ronisch - promesas cuando ya no me quieras
Los Ronisch - traicionera 
Los Ronisch - quisiera yo decirte  
Los Ronisch - Época de oro - 1998
Los Ronisch - Regresa - 1999
Los Ronisch - Destrozas Mi Corazón - 2001
Los Ronisch - Siempre Imitados, Nunca Igualados - 2004 
Los Ronisch - Corazones Rotos - 2008
Los Ronisch - Nunca te olvidaré - 2017

Musical style 
Cumbia, Huayño, Technocumbia or Tecnocumbia, Chicha, Rock & Pop, Disco.

References

External links 
 Video de Los Ronisch En Vivo

Bolivian musical groups